Prince Franciszek Ferdynant Lubomirski (c. 17101774) was a Polish noble (szlachcic) and Knight of the Order of the White Eagle, awarded on 3 August 1762 in Warsaw.

He was the son of the voivode of Kraków Voivodeship, Jerzy Dominik Lubomirski, and Magdalena Tarło.

He was Great Miecznik of the Crown from 1761 to 1771, Great Chorąży of the Crown after 1773, starost of Biecz and Great Envoy to Saint Petersburg.

1710 births
1774 deaths
Diplomats of the Polish–Lithuanian Commonwealth
Franciszek Ferdynant